Senna artemisioides, the wormwood senna, is a species of flowering plant in the pea family Fabaceae. It is endemic to Australia, where it is found in all mainland states and territories. Other common names include silver senna, silver cassia or feathery cassia - although "cassia" generally refers to the largest-growing Cassiinae. Some of its distinct subspecies also have common names of their own.

The Latin specific epithet artemisioides means “resembling Artemisia”, a different group of plants often known as wormwood.

Description
It has grey-green pinnate leaves with between 1 and 8 pairs of leaflets. It produces an abundance of yellow “pea” flowers in winter and spring which are about 1.5 cm in diameter, followed by 2 to 7 cm long flat green pods which age to dark brown.

The species adapts to a wide range of climatic conditions, but is susceptible to frost, especially when young. It prefers dry, well-drained sites with full sun. As an ornamental plant, it is propagated readily from seed, which should first be briefly immersed in boiling water.

This plant has gained the Royal Horticultural Society's Award of Garden Merit.

Taxonomy and systematics
The species was first described in 1825 by Charles Gaudichaud-Beaupré based on work by Augustin Pyramus de Candolle and placed in Cassia, but nowadays it has been moved to Senna. However, for a long time this plant was erroneously known as Cassia eremophila which is a true species of Cassia called desert cassia, described by Julius Rudolph Theodor Vogel.

A large number of formerly independent species are provisionally considered subspecies of S. artemisioides:
 ssp. alicia Randell  
 ssp. artemisioides
 ssp. filifolia Randell
 ssp. helmsii (Symon) Randell – blunt-leaved cassia
 ssp. oligophylla (F.Muell.) Randell – blunt-leaved cassia
 ssp. petiolaris Randell woody cassia
 ssp. quadrifolia Randell
(Senna quadrifolia Burm. is a synonym of Chamaecrista absus)
 ssp. sturtii (R.Br.) Randell – Sturt's cassia
 ssp. zygophylla (Benth.) Randell

Some hybridogenic subspecies have also been named:
 nothosubsp. × artemisioides 
 ssp. × coriacea (Benth.) Randell 
 nothosubsp. × coriacea (Benth.) Randell
(Cassia coriacea Benth. is a synonym of Chamaecrista coriacea)
 nothosubsp. × sturtii (R.Br.) Randell

In addition, there are apparently at least 2 undescribed taxa:
 Senna artemisioides "James Range (P.L.Latz 18528)" 
 Senna artemisioides "Kuyunba (B.Pitts 113)"

Altogether, S. artemisioides might be best considered a form taxon whose phylogenetic diversity is still largely unresolved.

References

Further reading

Association of Societies for Growing Australian Plants (ASGAP): Senna artemisioides

External links

University of Arizona Pima County Cooperative Extension: Cassia artemisiodes

artemisioides
Endemic flora of Australia
Flora of New South Wales
Flora of the Northern Territory
Flora of Queensland
Flora of South Australia
Rosids of Western Australia
Fabales of Australia

Garden plants of Australia
Drought-tolerant plants